The Philippines participated in the 2007 Asian Winter Games which was held in Changchun, China from January 28, 2007 to February 4, 2007.

Participation details

Figure skating

This country was represented by 5 skaters.

References

Asian Winter Games
Nations at the 2007 Asian Winter Games
Philippines at the Asian Winter Games